A petit gâteau (plural: petits gâteaux), is a small cake created by Michel Bras in 1981.  In French-speaking countries a dessert of a petit gâteau with chocolate is referred to as "gâteau fondant au chocolat" or simply "chocolat fondant" ("melting chocolate").

In the United States a dessert by the name "petit gâteau" has been popularized by some New York City restaurants since the 1990s.  It is composed of a small chocolate cake with crunchy rind and creamy filling that is conventionally served hot with vanilla ice cream on the side. Variations have come to include fruits and even alcoholic beverages, such as whisky.

See also

 List of desserts

French desserts
Chocolate desserts